Alistair Kydd Hanton   (1926 – 2021) was a British banker, transport campaigner and social entrepreneur who invented the direct debit system in 1964.

Hanton was awarded an OBE in the 1986 New Year Honours on his retirement as deputy managing director of National Girobank.

Biography

Early life

Hanton was born in north London on 10 October 1926.

His father, Peter Kydd Hanton, worked as an architect for the Ministry of Works. His mother, Maud (née Evans) was a secretary.

Education

Following schooling at Mill Hill School, including a period evacuated to St Bees in Cumberland during World War II, Hanton went to Pembroke College, Cambridge to study maths and economics.

Career

After graduating, a 22-year-old Hanton joined the newly-founded government overseas aid organisation, the Colonial Development Corporation in 1948, and after two years at head office in London was posted to Malawi to plan public works.

In 1957 Hanton took a job at the Industrial and Commercial Finance Corporation (ICFC, now 3i) which provided financial support for small firms. A year later, in 1958, Hanton joined the Economics and Statistics division of Unilever.

Joining Rio Tinto-Zinc Corporation in 1964 he developed the use of the discounted cash flow technique, and contributed to the book The Finance and Analysis of Capital Projects.

Hanton left Rio Tinto after four years to help found the new National Giro in 1968, retiring from the organisation 18 years later in 1987.

Direct debit

Direct debit was invented by Alastair Hanton while he was working at Unilever as a way of collecting payments more efficiently from Wall's ice cream sellers. Originally named automatic debit transfer it commenced operation, as a paper-based system, in 1964, becoming widely available from 1968.

National Giro

In 1982 Hanton was promoted from Operations Director to Deputy Managing Director.

In 1985, Hanton initiated the LINK ATM network that allowed customers to withdraw money from ATMs of banks other than their own.

Charity and campaign work

Hanton was one of the founders of The Fairtrade Foundation.

Hanton also founded the Environmental Transport Association, was vice-chairman of Christian Aid, chair of Living Streets and the London Cycling Campaign.

Family
Hanton married Margaret Lumsden, a market researcher and Cambridge graduate in 1956. They had two sons, Angus and Bruce, and a daughter Fiona.

References

English bankers
English inventors
British charity and campaign group workers
Officers of the Order of the British Empire
People educated at Mill Hill School
Alumni of Pembroke College, Cambridge
People from London
1926 births
2021 deaths